Jagdish Singh (born 1 July 1991) is an Indian cross-country skier, who represented India at 2018 Winter Olympics in PyeongChang. He competed in men's 15 km freestyle cross-country skiing. He qualified in the Olympics for the first time.

Career 
Singh joined the Indian Army in 2011. He received his training from Indian Army's High Altitude Warfare School (HAWS) in Gulmarg, Jammu & Kashmir. He qualified in the 2018 Winter Olympics by securing just one point above the qualification mark, during an event in Finland. There was a bit controversy during appointment of his coach, however, just before the event, HAWS recommended Nadeem Iqbal, a former winter Olympian, as his coach.

2018 Pyeongchang Winter Olympics  results

See also 
 India at the 2018 Winter Olympics

References

External links
 

1991 births
Living people
Cross-country skiers at the 2018 Winter Olympics
Skiers from Uttarakhand
Indian male cross-country skiers
Olympic cross-country skiers of India
Indian Army personnel
Cross-country skiers at the 2017 Asian Winter Games